Yunga may refer to either of the following two languages:
 Yunga language (Peru)
 Yunga language (Australia)